Rip Van Winkle is a 1912 Australian feature-length film directed by W. J. Lincoln about Rip Van Winkle. It was arguably Australia's first fantasy film.

It is considered a lost film.

Plot

Cast
Arthur Styan as Rip Van Winkle

Production
The film was made in the wake of a successful Australian season of Joseph Jefferson and Dion Boucicault's theatre adaptation of Washington Irving's 1819 short story "Rip Van Winkle".

One reviewer said that star Arthur Styan "has figured in several of the previous productions of the Amalgamated Pictures Ltd., and who makes quite a success of this."

Assisting Lincoln was Sam Crews.

Reception
The film appears not to have been widely released. The Bendigo Advertiser said that "the famous story is most effectively explained in the picture production."

In April 1912 The Bulletin said "Rip Van Winkle is biographed in Melbourne excellently, by an Australian company, with Styan as Winkle."

References

External links
 
Rip Van Winkle at AustLit
 Full text of Rip Van Winkle by of Joseph Jefferson and Dion Boucicault at Internet Archive

1912 films
1912 lost films
Australian black-and-white films
Australian silent films
Films based on Rip Van Winkle
Lost Australian films
Australian fantasy films
1910s fantasy films
Lost fantasy films
Films directed by W. J. Lincoln
Silent fantasy films
1910s English-language films